Louaï Majid El Ani (born 12 July 1997) is a Moroccan-Iraqi professional footballer who plays as an attacking midfielder for Al-Zawraa in the Iraqi Premier League.

Honours
Al-Quwa Al-Jawiya
 Iraqi Premier League: 2020–21
 Iraq FA Cup: 2020–21

References

External links
 

1997 births
Living people
Moroccan footballers
Association football midfielders
Botola players